The following lists events that happened during 1960 in the Belgian Congo.

Incumbent
Governor-general – Hendrik Cornelis

Events

See also

 Belgian Congo
 History of the Democratic Republic of the Congo
 1960 in the Republic of the Congo (Léopoldville)

References

Sources

 

 
1960s in the Belgian Congo
Years of the 20th century in the Democratic Republic of the Congo
Belgian Congo
Belgian Congo